Antha Mana Manchike  is a 2000 Telugu-language comedy film, produced by Mahesh Rathi on Manisha Films banner. It stars Rajendra Prasad, Rachana, Asha Saini  and music also composed by Veeru K. The film was recorded as average at the box office.

Plot
The film begins on Jagapathi (Rajendra Prasad) who falls for rapacious & vainglory girl Urmila (Rachana) who works as a lecturer in a college. Jagapathi seeks to acquire her love when fortuitously, he is acquainted with a person Balu (M. S. Narayana) in an accident, a newly appointed lecturer at Urmila's college. So, Jagapathi enrolls in his position but the truth comes forward and Jagapathi is arrested. During, Urmila learns Jagapathi as the son of a multi-millionaire Pichiswara Rao (Chalapathi Rao) thus she cons him into marriage lest his parents stop him. However, Pichiswara Rao realizes her character, and he shunts them out of the house. At Present, Jagapathi picks up a job in a company headed by Nisha (Asha Saini). Aside, Urmila makes all efforts to goad her husband to mend fences with his father. In that process, she throws Jagapathi into huge debts, which leads to turbulence between the couple and Urmila appeals for the divorce. in the court, she accepts herself as avaricious by virtue of her mother's life who has died out of poverty being a daughter of a millionaire for marrying a destitute. Here, the judge (Nutan Prasad) rejects her claim, since they are newly married they must wait one year to file for divorce. Forthwith, he makes them live in one roof under the surveillance of an Aaya Mandhara (Rama Prabha) along with the seven commandments. Eventually, Jagapathi's close friend Babji (Sudhakar) & his wife Sujikutti (Kovai Sarala) accompanies them. Just after, Urmila gets back her grandfather's property 1 crore through their loyal servant Tirupati (Tanikella Bharani) & his son Pasupati (Ali) providing Urmila and her husband should sign on the documents. Thereupon, Urmila tries to tame Jagapathi which vain, so, she forges Babji as her husband. Now a confusion drama begins involving many characters, Abu (Brahmanandam) a thief, is behind Urmila for money, Sujikutti is presented as Jagapathi's sister and Nisha as his wife. Pasupati tries to flirt Sujikutti. The rest of the story is a comic tale that how Jagapathi teaches a lesson to Urmila, whether she will be happy after winning Rs.1 crore or realizes her mistake?

Cast

Rajendra Prasad as Jagapathi
Rachana as Urmila
Asha Saini as Nisha
Brahmanandam as Abu 
Sudhakar as Babji
Ali as Pasupati
Tanikella Bharani as Tirupati
Nutan Prasad as Judge
M. S. Narayana as Music Teacher Balu
Chalapathi Rao as Pichiswara Rao
Mallikarjuna Rao as Pichiswara Rao's PA 
Costume Krishna as Urmila's father
Kishore Rathi as Theater Owner
Gadiraju Subba Rao as Court Amina
Jenny as Bank Manager
Kovai Sarala as Sujikutti
Rama Prabha as Aaya Mandhara
Yamuna as Urmila's friend
Siva Parvathi as Pichiswara Rao's wife
Rajini as Abu's wife
Kalpana Rai as Principal

Soundtrack

Music composed by Veeru K. Music released on HMV Audio Company.

Others
 VCDs and DVDs on - VOLGA Videos, Hyderabad

References

2000s Telugu-language films